Alph may refer to:
Alpheus River, a river on the Peloponnese
Alph River, a river in Antarctica
Alph Lake, a lake in Antarctica
Alph, a fictional river in the poem Kubla Khan by Samuel Taylor Coleridge
Alph, a character from Luminous Arc
Alph, a character from the game Pikmin 3

See also
ALF (disambiguation)
Alph Lyla, the in-house band of video game developer Capcom